Events from the year 1897 in Russia.

Incumbents
 Monarch – Nicholas II

Events

 Russian Empire Census
 World Chess Championship 1897
 Belushya Guba
 Moscow Art Theatre

Births

Deaths

References

1897 in Russia
Years of the 19th century in the Russian Empire